Ted 'Leather' McFadden (1880-1949) was an Australian professional rugby league footballer who played in the 1900s and 1910s. He played in the New South Wales Rugby Football League premiership. He was a foundation player of the Balmain club.

Playing career
Originally from Orange, New South Wales, McFadden made his first grade debut for Balmain against Western Suburbs on 20 April 1908 at Birchgrove Oval, which was the club's first ever game and also the opening week of the inaugural NSWRL competition.  Balmain went on to win the match 24–0 in front of 3000 spectators.

McFadden played with the club until the end of the 1910 season before retiring.

Ted McFadden died on 29 Jun 1949 at Balmain Hospital.

References

External links
 The Encyclopedia Of Rugby League Players; Alan Whiticker & Glen Hudson
 History Of The New South Wales Rugby League; Steve Haddan

1880 births
1949 deaths
Australian rugby league players
Balmain Tigers players
Rugby league hookers
Rugby league second-rows
Rugby league players from Orange, New South Wales